Kayunga–Galiraya Road is a road in the Central Region of Uganda connecting the town of Kayunga to the towns of Bbaale and Galilaya (Galiraya) on the shores of Lake Kyoga.

Location
The road connects the southern part of Kayunga District to the northern part of the district and forms the main road in the area. It runs in a south to north direction, with River Sezibwa to its west and the Victoria Nile to the road's east. The coordinates of the road near Bbaale are:0°50'49.0"N, 32°52'44.0"E (Latitude:0.846944; Longitude:32.878889).

Upgrading to bitumen
The government of Uganda has earmarked this road for upgrading from gravel to bitumen surface and the building of bridges and drainage channels. In July 2009, the government received funding from the African Development Bank, to engage consulting engineering firms to conduct detailed feasibility studies. The following consulting engineering firms have been shortlisted:

 Aurecon of South Africa 
 JBG Gauff Ingeniure of Germany
 TECNIC Consulting Engineers of Spain
 Aarvee Associates of India
 Coda & Partners

, project preparation was ongoing.

See also
 Kayunga District
 Ugandan Towns
 Economy of Uganda
 Uganda National Roads Authority
 List of roads in Uganda

References

External links
 Uganda National Road Authority Homepage
 Museveni Wants More Industries for Job Creation

 

Roads in Uganda
Kayunga District
Central Region, Uganda